The 1960 Waterford Senior Hurling Championship was the 60th staging of the Waterford Senior Hurling Championship since its establishment by the Waterford County Board in 1897.

Mount Sion were the defending champions.

On 9 October 1960, Mount Sion won the championship after a 5-09 to 2-05 defeat of Erin's Own in the final. This was their 16th championship title overall and their eighth title in succession.

References

Waterford Senior Hurling Championship
Waterford Senior Hurling Championship